Deboye is a commune of the Cercle of Youwarou in the Mopti Region of Mali. The commune contains 24 small villages. The local government is based in the village of Guidio-Sarre. In 2009 the commune had a population of 21,776.

References

External links
.

Communes of Mopti Region